The University of Basel (Latin: Universitas Basiliensis, German: Universität Basel) is a university in Basel, Switzerland. Founded on 4 April 1460, it is Switzerland's oldest university and among the world's oldest surviving universities. The university is traditionally counted among the leading institutions of higher learning in the country.

The associated Basel University Library is the largest and among the most important libraries in Switzerland. The university hosts the faculties of theology, law, medicine, humanities and social sciences, science, psychology, and business and economics, as well as numerous cross-disciplinary subjects and institutes, such as the Biozentrum for biomedical research and the Institute for European Global Studies. In 2020, the university had 13,139 students and 378 professors. International students accounted for 27 percent of the student body.

In its over 500-year history, the university has been home to Erasmus of Rotterdam, Paracelsus, Daniel Bernoulli, Leonhard Euler, Jacob Burckhardt, Friedrich Nietzsche, Tadeusz Reichstein, Karl Jaspers, Carl Gustav Jung, Karl Barth, and Jeanne Hersch. The institution is associated with ten Nobel laureates and two Presidents of the Swiss Confederation.

History

The University of Basel was founded in connection with the Council of Basel. It was during the years the catholic clergy resided in Basel, a temporary university was established between the years 1432 und 1448. In May 1432 it was authorized for Simon de Valla from Venice to lecture on canon law, in 1434 Jacques d'Attigny from France and was also permitted to lecture on canon law in Basel. d'Attigny had before been lecturing canon law at the University of Rome. In 1437 Demetrius was called to lecture Greek language. Also the function of a bedel is mentioned, but there was no mention of a dean or an University order. In 1448, the German King Frederick III came to an agreement with Pope Nicholas V, the successor of Eugen IV and ordered the city to remove the security of the councilors. The university was then formally closed in July 1448 and the clergy moved on to Lausanne. After they left, the former lecturers urged for a regular university to be established. The deed of foundation given in the form of a Papal bull by Pope Pius II on 12 November 1459 in Mantua and the official opening ceremony was held on 4 April 1460, the day of Saint Ambrose in the Minster of Basel. Originally the University of Basel was decreed to have four faculties—arts, medicine, theology, and jurisprudence. From 1497, the Grand Council of Basel discussed whether the University was to be closed and only in 1501, the year Basel joined the Swiss Confederation, it was decided not to close the university. The faculty of arts served until 1818 as the foundation for the other three academic subjects. In the eighteenth century as Basel became more commercial, the university, one of the centres of learning in the Renaissance, slipped into insignificance. Enrollment which had been over a thousand around 1600, dropped to sixty in 1785 with eighteen professors. The professors themselves were mostly sons of the elite.

Over the course of centuries as many scholars came to the city, Basel became an early centre of book printing and humanism. Around the same time as the university itself, the Basel University Library was founded. Today it has over three million books and writings and is the largest library in Switzerland.

Located in what was once a politically volatile area, the university's fate often ebbed and flowed with regional political developments, including the Reformation, the Kantonstrennung (separation of the Canton of Basel City from Basel Land), and both World Wars. These factors affected student attendance, funding, university-government relations. In 1833 the Canton of Basel split in two with the Federal Diet requiring that the canton's assets, including the books at the university library, be divided—two-thirds going to the new half canton of Basel-Landschaft. The city, Basel-Stadt, had to buy back this share and the university became so impoverished that it drastically reduced its course offerings. Students were expected to continue their education after two years or so at a German university.

Student enrollment surged after the university shed its medieval curriculum (including the elimination of Latin as the official language of the course catalog in 1822) and began to add more faculties, especially those in the humanities and sciences. Liberal Arts became a faculty in 1818, from which the Philosophy and History and Natural History faculties were derived in 1937. The university subsequently established the Faculty of Science (1937), the Faculty of Business and Economics (1996), and the Faculty of Psychology (2003). During the 20th century, the university grew rapidly, from one thousand students in 1918 to eight thousand in 1994. The first woman who was admitted to the university, Emilie Frey, began her medical studies in 1890.

After the seizure of power in the year 1933 by the Nazis in Germany, numerous renowned German professors decided to emigrate to Basel and started to work at the University of Basel. Several Swiss scholars also returned, inter alia the Law Professor Arthur Baumgarten (1933), the Theologians Karl Barth (1935) and Fritz Lieb (1937) and after World War II the Philosopher Karl Jaspers from Heidelberg University (1948), as well as the surgeon Rudolf Nissen (1952).

On January 1, 1996, the University of Basel became independent from the cantonal government and thus earned its right to self-government. In 2007, the Canton of Basel-Landschaft voted in favor to share the sponsorship of the university in parity with the Canton Basel-Stadt.

Seal 
Since 1460, the seal of the University showed a Virgin surrounded with sun rays standing a crescent moon as mentioned in the Revelation of John. Below the moon is the coat of arms of Basel. In her right hand, she holds a scepter, and on her left arm sits Jesus the child. The religious motive is described to denote the religious bond the university counted with at the beginning of its existence. The seal was also used after the reformation and used continuously until 1992.

Reputation and rankings

Well-respected rankings attest to the University of Basel's international academic performance:

 Times Higher Education World University Ranking (THE) (2021): 92
 CWTS Leiden Ranking (2019): 53
 Academic Ranking of World Universities (ARWU) (2019): 87

Organization

University administration
Since January 1, 1996, the University of Basel has been independent. The University Law of 1995 stipulates that, “The University of Basel is an institution established under public law. It has its own legal personality and right to self-government.” As the entity that formally receives the Performance Mandate (Leistungsauftrag) for the University from both supporting cantons, the University Council (Universitätsrat) is the supreme decision-making body of the university. The Council consists of eleven voting members and three non-voting members, including the President, the Executive Director, and the Secretary of the Council.
Beneath the University Council are the Senate (Regenz) and the President's Board. The 80-member Senate consists of the senior members of the President's Board, faculty deans, professors, lecturers and research assistants, assistants, students, and administrative and technical employees.
The President's Office is tasked with leading the overall university business. It consists of the President and her staff, a General Secretariat, an Administrative Directorate, the Communications and Marketing Office, and two respective Vice-Presidents for Research and Education.

Faculties and departments

The University of Basel currently houses seven faculties:

 Theology
 Law
 Medicine
 Department of Biomedicine (a joint venture among the University of Basel, the University Hospital, and the University Children's Hospital)
 Department of Biomedical Engineering
 Department of Public Health
 Department of Clinical Research
 Department of Sport, Exercise and Health
 Humanities and Social Sciences (Phil I)
 Department of Ancient Civilizations
 Department of History
 Department of Social Sciences
 Department Arts, Media, Philosophy
 Department of Languages and Literatures
 Digital Humanities Lab
 Science (Phil II)
 Biozentrum
 Department of Mathematics and Computer Science
 Department of Physics
 Department of Chemistry
 Department of Environmental Sciences
 Department of Pharmaceutical Sciences
 Business and Economics
 Psychology

Interdisciplinary institutions
 Institute for European Global Studies
 Center for Philanthropy Studies (CEPS)
 Institute for Biomedical Ethics (IBMB)
 Institute of Education

Associated institutes
 Swiss Tropical and Public Health Institute (Swiss TPH)
 Friedrich Miescher Institute for Biomedical Research (FMI)
 Basel Institute on Governance 
 Swiss Centre for Rescue, Emergency and Disaster Medicine (SZRNK)
 Swisspeace

Notable alumni and faculty
The University is counted among the country's leading institutions of higher learning and thus boasts a large number of politicians, scientists and thinkers as professors and alumni from all around the world alike:

 Emil Abderhalden (1877–1950), Swiss biochemist and physiologist
Bonifacius Amerbach (1495 – 1562) Swiss jurist
 Johann Konrad Ammann (1669–1724, Swiss physicist and educator of deaf children)
 Werner Arber (1929–), Swiss microbiologist and geneticist, Nobel Prize in Physiology or Medicine in 1978
 Karl Barth (1886–1968), Swiss Protestant theologian
 Caspar Bauhin (1560–1624), Swiss botanist
 Johann Bauhin (1541–1613), Swiss botanist
 Daniel Bernoulli (1700–1782), Swiss mathematician and physicist
 Jacob Bernoulli (1655–1705), prominent Swiss mathematician, after whom Bernoulli numbers are named
 Johann Bernoulli (1667–1748), Swiss mathematician
 Johann Georg Birnstiel (1858–1927), Swiss writer and clergyman
 James Montgomery Boice (1938–2000), American theologian and pastor
 Jacob Burckhardt (1818–1897), Swiss historian
 Meehyun Chung (1963–) South Korean theologian, professor of Yonsei University
 Jacques Dubochet (1942–), Swiss biophysicist, Nobel Prize in Chemistry in 2017
 Nikolaus Eglinger (1645–1711), Swiss physician
 Paul Erdman (1932–2007), American business and financial writer
 Leonhard Euler (1707–1783), mathematician and physicist
 Rudolf Eucken (1846–1926), philosopher, Nobel Prize in Literature in 1908 
 Christoph Gerber professor at the Department of Physics, co-inventor of the atomic force microscope
 Albert Gobat (1848–1914), Swiss politician, Nobel Peace Prize in 1902
 Arno David Gurewitsch (1902–1974), professor,  Columbia‐Presbyterian Medical Center, and personal physician to Eleanor Roosevelt
 Paul Herrling, professor of Drug Discovery Science
 Jeanne Hersch (1910–2000), Swiss philosopher
 Karl Jaspers (1883–1969), German-Swiss psychiatrist and philosopher
 Karl Gustav Jung (1795–1864), German-Swiss physician and surgeon, Rector and professor of the University 
 Carl Gustav Jung (1875–1961), Swiss psychiatrist, and founder of Analytical Psychology
 Eberhard Jüngel (1934–2021), German Lutheran theologian
 Jack Dean Kingsbury (1931–), American New Testament theologian and professor at Union Presbyterian Seminary
 Michael Landmann (1913–1984), Swiss-Israeli philosopher
 Yeshayahu Leibowitz (1903–1994), Israeli public intellectual and polymath
 Friedrich Miescher (1844–1895), Swiss physician and biologist, first researcher to isolate nucleic acid
 Alice Miller (1923–2010), Swiss psychologist and author
 David-François de Montmollin (1721-1803), Swiss colonist to Canada, Protestant minister, landowner
 Paul Hermann Müller (1899–1965), Swiss chemist, Nobel Prize in Physiology or Medicine in 1948
 Friedrich Nietzsche (1844–1900,) German philosopher, held Chair of Classical Philology at the University of Basel at the age of 24
 Christiane Nüsslein-Volhard (1942–), German biologist and biochemist, Nobel Prize in Physiology or Medicine in 1995
 Paracelsus (1493–1541), Swiss philosopher, physician, botanist and astrologer
 Tadeus Reichstein (1897–1996), Polish-Swiss chemist, Nobel Prize in Physiology or Medicine in 1950
 John H. Rodgers Jr. (1930–2022), American systematic theologian and Anglican bishop
 Otto Stich (1927–2012), President of the Swiss Confederation
 Emmanuel Stupanus (1587–1664), Swiss physician
 William Theilheimer (1914–2005), German-American scientist
 Lilian Uchtenhagen (1928–2016), Swiss politician and economist
 Peter Werenfels (1627–1703), Swiss theologian
 Kurt Wüthrich (1938–), Swiss chemist, Nobel Prize in Chemistry in 2002
 Iona Yakir (1896–1937), Red Army commander
 Rolf Zinkernagel (1944–), Swiss physician, Nobel Prize in Physiology or Medicine in 1996
 Hans Zingg (M.D.) — Professor Emeritus of Pharmacology and Therapeutics, Professor of Medicine, Professor of Obstetrics and Gynecology, and Wyeth-Ayerst Chair in Women's Health at McGill University

Student life
The university hosts several formal institutions that are intended to serve the needs of its students. The Student Advice Center  provides advice on academic degree programs and career opportunities. The Student Services provides information on applications, grants, mobility, exchanges, and disability services.

Student organizations
There are also a variety of organizations that cater to international students, such as local chapters of Toastmasters and AIESEC, and associations that perform community services (Beraber, for instance, provides remedial lessons to immigrant youth). There is a foreign affairs association (Foraus), a Model United Nations team, and various choirs and orchestras. There are also various religious groups.

A number of other student groups exist out of formal venues. The most recognizable are the “Studentenverbindungen,” traditional student associations dating from the 19th century that organize social events, share common uniforms, and often focus on particular hobbies, such as sword fighting. Such associations include the Akademische Turnerschaft Alemannia zu Basel, AKW Raurica, Helvetia Basel, Jurassia Basiliensis, Schwizerhüsli, A.V. Froburger, and Zofingia. Membership in many is restricted to men, though A.V. Froburger also accepts women.

University sports
University Sports provides a gym, fitness classes, and sport and dance camps to students and employees of the university.

Student union
The Studentische Körperschaft der Universität Basel (skuba) speaks on behalf of the students and represents their needs and interests. It acts as an official student representative and has no political or religious affiliations.

Alumni association
The university has a general alumni association, AlumniBasel, as well as specific alumni associations for the Europainstitut, Medicine, Law, Business and Economics, Dentistry, and Nursing.

See also
 Biozentrum University of Basel
 List of largest universities by enrollment in Switzerland
 List of medieval universities
 Basel University Library

Notes and references

Further reading
 Bonjour, Edgar, Die Universität Basel von den Anfängen bis zur Gegenwart 1460–1960 (Basel : Helbing und Lichtenhahn, 1971)

External links

 Official Website of the university
 History website of the university
 Swiss Tropical and Public Health Institute (Swiss TPH) – an associated institute of the university – travel and tropical medicine, international health, medical parasitology and the biology of infection, public health and epidemiology.
 Information about the university
 Studierendenstatistik der Universität Basel
 University Rankings – University of Basel (2008)

 
Public universities
Basel, University of
Basel, University of
Buildings and structures in Basel